Neptis lamtoensis  is a butterfly in the family Nymphalidae. It is found in Ivory Coast.

References

Butterflies described in 2007
lamtoensis
Endemic fauna of Ivory Coast
Butterflies of Africa